Holy Name of Jesus Parish is a Roman Catholic church in Redlands, California, United States, founded on July 1, 2006. It is part of the Diocese of San Bernardino. The Church is located on two sites, on the north side of town is the Columbia Street location formerly Saint Mary's Catholic Church. And the south side of Redlands, at the Olive Avenue location is the former Sacred Heart Catholic Church.

History 
The first known Christian settlement in Redlands, CA. was the catholic San Bernardino de Sena Estancia by Francisco Dumetz. Established in 1819 on the feast day of Saint Bernardine. Part of an outpost of the Mission San Gabriel Arcángel located 56 miles away near Los Angeles, CA. A days trip walking. No large populations existed. Used to convert local native Tongva, Serrano, and Cahuilla Native Americans. With Spanish colonization and the subsequent Mexican era the area was sparsely populated at the land grant Ranchos, considering it unsuitable for an actual mission. The estancia was sold to José del Carmen Lugo who made it his home. 

The Discalced Carmelite Friars of the California-Arizona Province established in 1952 a retreat campus. The Carmelo Retreat House. Located adjacent to Ford Street Park.

Sacred Heart

After American annexation in 1848, large amounts of European-Americans arrived, Redlands was officially founded in 1881 and many European, Californios and Mexican Catholics moved into the area there after. Before any specific place of worship was constructed, community members worshiped in a local community center and local rented store fronts for $10 a month. The first building constructed was the Sacred Heart Academy with a small parish. The chapel opened in 1896 as Sacred Heart Catholic Parish and the academy opened previously in 1887. This is what is now known as the Olive Avenue location site. Both located at the current Olive Avenue address. The current church was re-constructed in 1963 in Postmodern architecture.

Saint Mary's

The north Redlands Parish location was founded by the Mexican-American community. Mostly by not feeling welcomed at Sacred Heart. They built their own chapel called Our Lady of Mercy Catholic Parish in the orange groves of north Redlands in January 1938. A mostly Hispanic neighborhood. The church female "Doñas"  raised funds to construct a larger church. Selling "conchas and tamales" to raise funds. The current church was built and renamed St. Mary's in 1941, then physically moved to its current location on Columbia Street in 1986. Built in Mission Revival architecture.

Merger
The diocese of San Bernardino was concerned with the concept of one community with two separated churches. Historically, each location self segregated in the 1930s. Mostly to accommodate Anglo parishioners, who dissuaded Hispanics from attending Sacred Heart Church already established. To amend this, the diocese decided to create one sole church in the City of Redlands to create unity, simplicity for worshipers and the church. They established the Holy Name of Jesus Catholic Church in 2006. Named ‘’Iglesia Catolica Santo Nombre de Jesus’’ in Spanish.
Among the highlights of the merger, the parishioners hold a yearly traditional Marian procession from Columbia St. to mass at the Olive Ave. location on Our Lady of Guadalupe feast day, December 12. The 1.5 mile procession thru downtown Redlands with help from local authorities. Mostly traffic control.

Relocation
Announced in 2015, the church purchased a lot and is currently raising funds to relocate to a new location at the northeast side of town. A vacant lot on the northwest corner of Lugonia Avenue and Dearborn Street. The plans include a 35,000 square ft campus, a 1,500 person capacity church to service over 3,000 families and a new Sacred Heart campus to service over 600 students of the Academy. The church plans to sell its other two location sites, the old academy property and another two properties purchased in its name. The cost is budgeted at $26.4 million. Plans were to break ground in 2020.

Former clergy
Father Joseph Felker - 1994 to 2004 - Sacred Heart.
Father Jose Cima - 1991 to 1997 - Saint Mary's.
 Rev. Father Charles "Gino" Galley (2016 to 2022)

References

Churches in California
Redlands, California